Bodianus leucosticticus, the lined hogfish, is a species of wrasse. It is found in the Indo West Pacific.

Size

References

leucostictus
Fish of the Pacific Ocean
Taxa named by Edward Turner Bennett
Fish described in 1832